The Baïse is a  long river in south-western France, left tributary of the Garonne. Its source is in the foothills of the Pyrenees, near Lannemezan. It flows north through the following départements and towns:
 Hautes-Pyrénées: Lannemezan, Trie-sur-Baïse
 Gers: Mirande, Castéra-Verduzan, Valence-sur-Baïse, Condom
 Lot-et-Garonne: Nérac, Lavardac

It flows into the Garonne near Aiguillon.

Tributaries
 Gélise (in Lavardac)
 Osse (in Nérac)
 Petite Baïse (in L'Isle-de-Noé)

References

External links
 River Baise guide Places, ports and moorings on the River Baise - french-waterways.com

Rivers of France
Rivers of Gers
Rivers of Hautes-Pyrénées
Rivers of Lot-et-Garonne
Rivers of Nouvelle-Aquitaine
Rivers of Occitania (administrative region)